James Burnes (born January 14, 1870, date of death unknown) was an Private serving in the United States Marine Corps during the Boxer Rebellion who received the Medal of Honor for bravery.

Biography
Burnes was born January 14, 1870, in Worcester, Massachusetts, and enlisted into the Marine Corps from Mare Island, California on June 9, 1898. After entering the Marine Corps he was sent as a private to China to fight in the Boxer Rebellion.

He was serving in Tientsin, China, on June 20, 1900, and along with three other Marines crossed a river in a small boat under heavy enemy fire to destroy several buildings that were occupied by hostile forces. For his actions that day he received he Medal of Honor on March 22, 1902.  He was discharged from the Marine Corps on June 8, 1903, in Bremerton, Washington. He reenlisted on June 16, 1903. He received a bad conduct discharge on March 30, 1905.

Medal of Honor citation
Rank and organization: Private, U.S. Marine Corps. Born: 14 January 1870, Worcester, Mass. Accredited to: California. G.O. No.: 84, 22 March 1902.

Citation:

In action against the enemy at Tientsin, China, 20 June 1900. Crossing the river in a small boat with 3 other men while under a heavy fire from the enemy, Burnes assisted in destroying buildings occupied by hostile forces.

See also

List of Medal of Honor recipients for the Boxer Rebellion

References

External links

1870 births
Year of death missing
United States Marine Corps Medal of Honor recipients
United States Marines
American military personnel of the Boxer Rebellion
People from Worcester, Massachusetts
Boxer Rebellion recipients of the Medal of Honor